A list of Family Affair (1966–1971) episodes:

Series overview
All five seasons have been released on DVD by MPI Home Video.

Episodes

Season 1 (1966–67)

Season 2 (1967–68)

Season 3 (1968–69)

Season 4 (1969–70)

Season 5 (1970–71)

References

External links

 

Lists of American sitcom episodes